The Douz Sahara Museum is an archaeological museum located in Douz, Tunisia. It was established in 1997. The museum is centered on the culture of the Tunisian Sahara.

See also
Dar Jellouli Museum
Nabeul Museum

References

Kebili Governorate
Museums in Tunisia